Tarakanov Ridge is a prominent ridge from the Cobham Range, between the Gray Glacier and Prince Philip Glacier. Mapped by the United States Geological Survey (USGS) from tellurometer surveys and Navy air photos, 1960–62. Named by Advisory Committee on Antarctic Names (US-ACAN) for Gennady Tarakanov, Soviet exchange scientist, meteorologist at McMurdo Station, 1963.

Ridges of Oates Land